Julius Jr. is an animated children’s television series based on the characters of the Paul Frank brand. Co-produced by Saban Brands and BrainPower Studio, Julius Jr. aired on Family Channel and Family Jr. on May 12, 2015. In Canada, and Nick Jr. in the United States. The series debuted on September 29, 2013, with the second season premiering on November 3, 2014. The show’s last episode aired on August 9, 2015, when the TV series was taken off the air. All online content regarding the show was removed from the Nick Jr. website as well.

On May 1, 2018, Saban Brands sold the rights to the series to Hasbro. The show was previously available on Netflix, but was removed from the streaming service on November 3, 2020. It was added to Crave on August 10, 2022.

Premise
The series centers around Julius Jr., a monkey with a penchant for invention. Together with his friends, Worry Bear, Sheree, Clancy, and Ping, they build a playhouse out of a simple cardboard box. But when they walk inside, to their surprise and delight, they discover that ordinary objects magically come to life and amazing adventures are just a door away in a magical hall.

At the end of each episode, an original song is featured. The song shows highlights from the shown episode. Most known songs are Hey Hey Hey, Come on, Come On, Honesty (For You and Me), Stronger and Braver, Big Dance Party, and more.

Hall of Doors:
The Hall of Doors has many doors and some doors they enter them. These are the doors, that they frequently go.

 Icelaska- A parody of Alaska and Iceland.
 Bugswana- A parody of Botswana
 Seashelly Islands- Named after seashells.
 Twirl-a-World- A parody of Twirl-a-Whirl.
 Castledonia- Named after castles.
 Sagebrush Farm- Named after the sagebrush plants.
 Enginopolis- Named after engines.
 Unknown- Where the Hoozy Woozies live.

Characters

Main
Julius Jr. (voiced by E.G. Daily) is the protagonist of the series. He is simply called "Julius" on most occasions, a young chimp and an aspiring inventor who loves to create gadgets to help his friends. He resides in "the box" where he has his own workshop. His catchphrase is "The best inventions are the ones that help your friends!" Although he is an ape, he does not find bananas delicious and instead prefers peanut butter and jelly sandwiches. He loves watermelon, called wiggly watermelon on the show. His musical instrument is an electric guitar. His superhero alias is Captain Invention.
Clancy (voiced by Julie Lemieux) is a short giraffe who resides in the box along with Julius and his friends. Clancy is a young teenage giraffe. Clancy is competitive and often wants to be the best at anything. But he can be a bit impatient at times. His head is larger than the rest of his body. He is world record holder on the show. He likes kumquats, called kooky kumquats on the show. His musical instruments are a hammond organ, and on rare occasions a saxophone. His superhero alias is Giraffe Boy. He is the sidekick of Captain Invention.
Sheree (voiced by Athena Karkanis) is a light blue raccoon who resides in the box along with Julius and his friends. Sheree is girly, and she loves to bake cupcakes and other desserts. She also loves anything sparkly, and has a great sense of fashion. Only she and Julius wear clothes. She likes cupcakes and smooshberries (a parody of many berries). Her musical instrument is an electric bass.
Worry Bear (voiced by Benjamin Israel) is a bear who resides in the box along with Julius and his friends. He "lives up to his name", as he worries about many different things. Because of this, he often exercises caution when engaging in an activity. He is the only male band member to be voiced by an actor. He has a sock ape named Rocky. He likes grapefruit, called giggly grapefruit. His musical instrument is a set of drums.
Ping (voiced by Stephanie Lynn Robinson) is a squeaky-voiced panda cub who resides in "the box" along with Julius and her friends. She is very outgoing, cheerful, bubbly, giggly, and playful just like all kids and children. Unfortunately, due to her age, she is not very independent. Worry Bear is her step-cousin. She has a dance move which she kicks her knees to her chin. She likes cherries, called chew-chew cherries. Her musical instrument is a tambourine.

Others
Shaka Brah Yeti (voiced by Rob Tinkler) is a snowboarding yeti who resides in "Icelaska," which is located in "the hall of doors".
Sylvia and Gloria (voiced by Michelle Norland-Arnis and Jadeah Lily Miller) are two caterpillars that reside in "Bugswana", which is located in "the hall of doors".
Diamondbeard (voiced by Tysòn Blakely) is a gorilla pirate who resides on Seashelly Island (in “the hall of doors”). He has tiny diamonds embedded on his beard as his name implies. He also has a domineering mother who can be heard speaking but isn't seen. He likes sour food, but hates gruel.
The Wandering Wardrobe is an animated closet that contains different attires for Sheree and her friends.
Bob (voiced by John Kingston) is the giggling red beagle who operates “Twirl-a-world” which is in “the hall of doors”.
Sharky (voiced by Emma Ordal) is Diamondbeard's nephew.
Nadia (voiced by Mikela Fe-McClurg) is a squid who repairs machines. She enjoys working a lot even if it means very few rest times. She lives in “Enginopolis” which is in “the hall of doors”.
Rock Sock 3000 (squeaking noises performed by Gracie Anne) is a robot resembling a larger version of Worry Bear's doll. Julius can program it for various purposes, although it also has a tendency to go haywire. At the end he always says, “Under appreciated”.
Dez is a shy dragon with a plaid blue color. He's quite socially close to Ping. He is also the pet of Marv.
Brewster is the rooster who runs “Sagebrush Farm” which is in “the hall of doors”. He is a regular participant of Crow-Con.
Marv is a magician who lives in “Castledonia” located in “the hall of doors”.
Sidney is a millipede who lives in “Bugswana”.
Scooter is an airplane.
Hoozy Woozies are furballs that scream “Hoozy Woozy!”
Two Giants - They’re two giants.
Keepin’ Time Jones - He’s a clock that says the time.
Nova is a star that is best friends with Ping and is very sensitive.
Squeakers is Julius’ best friend, a rubber duck he lost as a baby. He then gave it to Ping and lives next to Chachi.
Dr. Paperwork is the imaginary foe of Captain Invention.
Barney is the barn (his name has the word barn in it) at Sagebrush.
Chickens that always are on the loose, and disobey Brewster.
Rocks is Worry Bear’s rock collection.
Martians - Aliens that live on Mars.
Super Sock is Worry Bear’s favorite superhero. He is very forgetful on remembering his most famous adventures. His villain is Polyester. He resides in Enginopolis, which is in the “hall of doors”.

Episodes

Season 1 (2013–2014)

Season 2 (2014–2015)

Broadcast
Following its U.S. premiere, the show later premiered on Discovery Kids in 2014 in Latin America. In the United Kingdom, Cartoonito premiered Julius Jr. on April 6, 2015.

The show premiered in Albania on Çufo on May 4, 2016 under the title "Xhuliusi i vogël" (Little Julius). In Canada, The show premiered on Family Jr.

References

External links
 Official website

2013 American television series debuts
2015 American television series endings
2010s American animated television series
2013 Canadian television series debuts
2015 Canadian television series endings
2010s Canadian animated television series
2010s preschool education television series
American children's animated adventure television series
American flash animated television series
American preschool education television series
Animated preschool education television series
Animated television series about apes
Animated television series about children
Canadian children's animated adventure television series
Canadian flash animated television series
Canadian preschool education television series
English-language television shows
Fictional scientists
Fictional inventors
Nick Jr. original programming
Television series by Saban Capital Group
Television series by Hasbro Studios